Cheikhou Dieng (born 23 November 1993) is a Senegalese professional footballer who plays as a midfielder for Ekstraklasa club Zagłębie Lubin.

Career

Sandefjord
Dieng began his career at Ndar Guedj in Senegal. For the 2012 season he moved to Norwegian First Division club Sandefjord. He made his league debut in April 2012, when he came on as a substitute for Martin Torp in the 84th minute on the fourth matchday of that season against Strømmen IF. In August 2012, he scored his first goal in Norway's second tier in a 3–0 win over Tromsdalen UIL. In the 2012 season, he came to a total of 23 second division appearances, in which he scored four goals. The following season, he scored three goals in 26 games. In the 2014 season, he won the second-tier title with Sandefjord and thus won promotion to Tippeligaen. In the promotion season he scored two goals in 26 appearances.

After promotion, Dieng made his Tippeligaen debut in April 2015 against Bodø/Glimt, recording an assist to compatriot Jean Alassane Mendy in a 3–1 win. In the same month, he scored his first goal in Tippeligaen in a 2–1 defeat against Viking. By the end of the season, he had made 27 appearances, scoring three goals. Sandefjord, however, was relegated to the second tier as bottom of the table after one season.

SKN St. Pölten
Dieng then moved to Austria in January 2016 to second division club SKN St. Pölten, signing a contract until June 2018. For SKN he made 17 appearances in the second division until the end of the season, scoring six goals. As second division champion, he won promotion to the Austrian Football Bundesliga with St. Pölten at the end of the season.

İstanbul Başakşehir
After promotion, Dieng moved to Turkey for the 2016–17 season to İstanbul Başakşehir, where he signed a three-year contract. In Istanbul, however, he had a difficult time and, also due to injury, he only made 1 appearance in the Süper Lig in his first half year. Therefore, he returned to St. Pölten on loan in January 2017. For the relegation-threatened Lower Austrians he made 13 Bundesliga appearances and scored 1 goal, as he helped the club avoid relegation at the end of the season. After the end of the loan, he first returned to Başakşehir.

In August 2017, he was loaned to TFF First League club MKE Ankaragücü. In the Ankara-based club, however, he could not assert himself as a starter, and the loan was terminated prematurely in January 2018 after 8 appearances in the second tier. In February 2018 he joined Serbian SuperLiga club Spartak Subotica on loan. Also in Subotica he did not get beyond the role of substitute, and he finished the season with 8 appearances in the SuperLiga, where he only made a start twice.

In August 2018, he returned to Austria and joined Bundesliga club Wacker Innsbruck on loan. For the Tyroleans, he featured as a winger and appeared in 26 Bundesliga games in the 2018–19 season, scoring 4 goals. With Wacker, however, he suffered relegation from the Bundesliga at the end of the season. After the end of the loan, his contract with İstanbul Başakşehir was not renewed, and so he left the club after four loans.

Wolfsberger AC
After half a year without a club, Dieng moved to Wolfsberger AC from the Austrian Football Bundesliga in January 2020, where he received a contract running until June 2020. For the Carinthians he made 12 appearances in the 2019–20 Bundesliga season in which he scored once. With the club he also qualified for the UEFA Europa League after finishing third in the league table. His expiring contract with Wolfsberger AC was extended in July 2020 until June 2022.

Zagłebie Lubin
On 28 February 2022, Dieng joined Polish Ekstraklasa side Zagłębie Lubin, signing a two-and-a-half-year contract.

International career
Dieng played for the Senegal U23 national team. He played at the 2015 U-23 Africa Cup of Nations, held in Senegal.

He also played with Senegal U23 at the 2015 African Games where they won the gold.

Career statistics

Club

Honours
Sandefjord
 1. divisjon: 2014

SKN St. Pölten
 Austrian Football First League: 2015–16

References

External links
 
 

1993 births
Living people
Senegalese footballers
Senegalese expatriate footballers
Sandefjord Fotball players
SKN St. Pölten players
İstanbul Başakşehir F.K. players
FK Spartak Subotica players
MKE Ankaragücü footballers
FC Wacker Innsbruck (2002) players
Wolfsberger AC players
Zagłębie Lubin players
Serbian SuperLiga players
Norwegian First Division players
2. Liga (Austria) players
Austrian Football Bundesliga players
Eliteserien players
Süper Lig players
Ekstraklasa players
II liga players
2015 Africa U-23 Cup of Nations players
African Games gold medalists for Senegal
African Games medalists in football
Association football midfielders
Competitors at the 2015 African Games
Expatriate footballers in Norway
Expatriate footballers in Austria
Expatriate footballers in Turkey
Expatriate footballers in Serbia
Expatriate footballers in Poland
Senegalese expatriate sportspeople in Norway
Senegalese expatriate sportspeople in Serbia
Senegalese expatriate sportspeople in Turkey
Senegalese expatriate sportspeople in Austria
Senegalese expatriate sportspeople in Poland
People from Dakar Region